Klaus Isekenmeier (born 14 April 1975 in Salzkotten, North Rhine-Westphalia) is a retired German decathlete. His personal best score was 8310 points, achieved in June 1997 in Ratingen.

Achievements

References

1975 births
Living people
People from Paderborn (district)
Sportspeople from Detmold (region)
German decathletes